Periowave is an antimicrobial photodynamic therapy (a-PDT) machine. It is used in periodontics, endodontics, and operative dentistry to kill bacteria or inhibit the growth of bacteria (e.g. Porphyromonas gingivalis). Antimicrobial photodynamic therapy is the process in which light and a photosensitizer are used to destroy the cell membranes of the bacteria by the action of reactive oxygen species and singlet oxygen. Professor Michael Wilson of University College London is the pioneer of photo disinfection or a-PDT which is a non-invasive, non-antibiotic, and non-surgical procedure. The Periowave (a-PDT) system was introduced to the market by Ondine Biomedical Inc., Vancouver B.C. in 2006. Periowave is approved for the treatment of chronic periodontitis, gingivitis, endodontics, and peri-implantitis disease.

It is a non-antibiotic therapy that destroys gram-negative oral pathogens without pain, heat, or surgery. Unlike thermal lasers that cut tissue, Periowave utilizes a cold (non-thermal) diode laser. It does not cause damage to root surfaces, dental materials, or surrounding tissues. Periowave does not exhibit many of the issues commonly associated with antibiotics, such as bacterial resistance, allergic or sensitivity reactions, opportunistic infections, or prolonged doses of medication.

Uses
Gingivitis
Pericoronitis
Endodontic treatment
Peri-implantitis
Dental caries

See also
Photodynamic therapy
Methylene blue
Reactive oxygen species
Singlet oxygen
MTT assay

References

External links
 Periowave official website

Dental equipment